Kim Woo-gyeom (born 8 February 1995) is a South Korean road and track cyclist, who currently rides for UCI Continental team . He won the bronze medal in the 1 km time trial at the 2016 Asian Cycling Championships.

References

External links

1995 births
Living people
South Korean track cyclists
South Korean male cyclists
Place of birth missing (living people)
20th-century South Korean people
21st-century South Korean people